The 1997 Rallye El Corte Inglés was the 21st Rally Islas Canarias/Rallye El Corte Inglés, a rally held as part of the European Rally Championship and the Spanish Rally Championship.

In 1997, Jesús Puras (Citroën ZX Kit Car) had his first of three wins in this event, finishing ahead of Bruno Thiry and Juha Kankkunen.

Results

References

1997 in Spain
1997 in Spanish sport